Edward Samuel Lacey (November 26, 1835 – October 2, 1916) was a politician from the U.S. state of Michigan and Comptroller of the Currency from 1889 to 1892.

Biography 
Lacey was born in Chili, New York and moved with his parents to Branch County, Michigan, in October 1842, and then to Eaton County in March 1843. He attended the public schools and Olivet College and engaged in various business pursuits and in banking. He was a resident of Kalamazoo, 1853–1857 and moved to Charlotte, where he was register of deeds for Eaton County, 1860–1864, and the mayor of Charlotte in 1871. He was also trustee of the Michigan Asylum for the Insane 1874-1880, and a delegate to the Republican National Convention in 1876.

Lacey was elected as a Republican to represent Michigan's 3rd congressional district in the Forty-seventh and Forty-eighth Congresses, serving from March 4, 1881 to March 3, 1885.

Lacey declined to be a candidate for reelection in 1884. He also served as chairman of the Michigan Republican Party, 1882-1884. He was commissioned by U.S. President Benjamin Harrison to be Comptroller of the Currency on April 17, 1889 and was reappointed December 16, 1889, serving until his resignation in 1892. He moved to Chicago and again engaged in banking. He died in Evanston, Illinois and is interred in Maple Hill Cemetery, in Charlotte, Michigan.

References

External links 

The Political Graveyard

1835 births
1916 deaths
United States Comptrollers of the Currency
Comptrollers in the United States
Republican Party members of the United States House of Representatives from Michigan
People from Chili, New York
19th-century American politicians
People from Branch County, Michigan
People from Kalamazoo, Michigan
People from Charlotte, Michigan
Benjamin Harrison administration personnel